Uzovo is a village in the municipality of Bujanovac, Serbia. According to the 2002 census, the settlement has a population of 10 people. Of these, 8 (80,0 %) were ethnic Albanians, and 2 (20,0 %) were Serbs.

References

Populated places in Pčinja District
Albanian communities in Serbia